Anthocercis gracilis, also known as slender tailflower, is a rare species of shrub in the family Solanaceae. It is native to  Western Australia where it grows on sandy or loamy soils, and on granite outcrops. It is a spindly, erect shrub which can grow to 1 m high. Its yellow-green flowers may be seen from September to October.

The species was first formally described by George Bentham in 1846.

References

Nicotianoideae
Solanales of Australia
Eudicots of Western Australia
Plants described in 1846
Taxa named by George Bentham